James Needham Buffum (May 16, 1807 – June 12, 1887) was a Massachusetts politician who served as the 12th and 14th Mayor of Lynn, Massachusetts.

Early life
Buffum was born in North Berwick, Maine on May 16, 1807 to Samuel and Hannah (Varney) Bufum.

Career
Buffum was the Mayor of Lynn, Massachusetts from 1869 to 1870 and from 1872 to 1873. He was a member of the Massachusetts House of Representatives. He was a presidential elector in 1868.

Abolitionist
When Frederick Douglass was dragged out of a train car on the Eastern Railroad, Buffum helped Douglass fight off the mob.

In 1845 Buffum went to Scotland with Douglass to protest against the Free Church of Scotland keeping money donated from American slaveholders.

Death
Buffum died on June 12, 1887, and is interred at Pine Grove Cemetery (Lynn, Massachusetts).

References

External links 
 New York Times obituary; June 13, 1888.
 
 Massachusetts Historical Society
 The Political Graveyard

1807 births
1887 deaths
Mayors of Lynn, Massachusetts
American abolitionists
Republican Party members of the Massachusetts House of Representatives
People from North Berwick, Maine
19th-century American politicians